Ochthephilum elegans is a species of rove beetles in the subfamily Paederinae. It is found in Australia (East Australia (Victoria) and South Australia).

References

External links 

 Ochthephilum elegans at insectoid.info

Beetles described in 1888
Paederinae
Beetles of Australia